The Freeport station of Freeport, Illinois originally served the Illinois Central Railroad. Over the years, the station hosted the Illinois Central's Hawkeye, Iowan, Land O'Corn, and Sinnissippi trains. Passenger service ceased upon the formation of Amtrak in 1971, but resumed between Chicago and Dubuque in 1974 under the name Black Hawk. Service ceased again on September 30, 1981. The depot still stands as a business.

Milwaukee Road station

To the northeast of the Illinois Central depot stands the Freeport Milwaukee Road depot in a dilapidated state.  This station served the Racine & Southwestern Line of the Milwaukee Road and hosted the a section of the Chicago to Kansas City Southwest Limited and a section of the Chicago to Omaha Arrow. Both of these services split off the Chicago bound trains at Savanna, Illinois to head towards Milwaukee, Wisconsin and did the reverse when heading to Kansas City or Omaha.

References

External links
Freeport, Illinois– TrainWeb

Former Amtrak stations in Illinois
Former Illinois Central Railroad stations
Former Chicago and North Western Railway stations
Railway stations opened in 1855
1974 establishments in Illinois
Railway stations closed in 1971
Railway stations in the United States opened in 1974
Railway stations closed in 1981